Mecopoda elongata is a species of bush cricket of the subfamily Mecopodinae. Species can be found in India, Sri Lanka, Indo-China, China, Taiwan, Malesia through to Melanesia.

Subspecies
The Orthoptera Species File lists:
 M. elongata elongata (synonym M. elongata burmeisteri and others)
 M. elongata pallida

References

External links

Orthoptera of Asia
Tettigoniidae
Insects described in 1758
Taxa named by Carl Linnaeus